Solomon in Society is a 1922 American silent drama film directed by Lawrence C. Windom and starring Charles Delaney and Lillian Herlein.

Cast
 William H. Strauss as 	I. Solomon
 Brenda Moore as Rosie Solomon
 Nancy Deaver as 	Mary Bell
 Charles Delaney asFrank Wilson
 Fred T. Jones as	Orlando Kolin
 Lillian Herlein as 	Mrs. Levy
 Charles Brook as 	The Butler

References

Bibliography
 Connelly, Robert B. The Silents: Silent Feature Films, 1910-36, Volume 40, Issue 2. December Press, 1998.
 Munden, Kenneth White. The American Film Institute Catalog of Motion Pictures Produced in the United States, Part 1. University of California Press, 1997.

External links
 

1922 films
1922 drama films
1920s English-language films
American silent feature films
Silent American drama films
American black-and-white films
Films directed by Lawrence C. Windom
1920s American films